The migration to Abyssinia, also known as the First Hijra, was an episode in the early history of Islam, where the first followers of the Islamic prophet Muhammad (they were known as the Sahabah) fled from Arabia due to their persecution by the Quraysh, the ruling Arab tribal confederation of Mecca. The ruling Aksumite monarch who received them is known in Islamic sources as Najashi, the Negus of the kingdom; modern historians have alternatively identified him with the Aksumite king Armah and Ella Tsaham. Some of the Sahabah exiles returned to Mecca and made the migration to Medina with Muhammad, while others remained in Aksum and arrived in Medina in 628.

Background
According to the traditional view, members of the early Muslim community in Mecca faced persecution, which prompted Muhammad to advise them to seek refuge in Aksum. The earliest extant account is given in the sirah of the eighth-century Muslim historian Ibn Ishaq:

Another view, grounded in the political developments of the time, suggests that following the capture of Jerusalem in 614 by the Sasanian Empire, many believers saw a potential danger to the community as they were not the partisans of the Persians who practiced Zoroastrianism and had earlier supported the Jews of Arabia in Himyar. The acceptance of these Muslims into the Kingdom of Aksum at precisely a moment of Persian triumph in the Levant recalls the Aksumite foreign policy of the previous century, which saw Aksum and Persia compete for influence in Arabia.

The migration(s)
According to historians of Islam, there were two migrations, although there are differences of opinion with regard to the dates.

The first group of migrants, which comprised twelve men and four women, who fled Arabia in the year  or  according to other sources, and was granted asylum by Najashi, the Negus of the Kingdom of Aksum, a Christian state that existed in modern-day Ethiopia and Eritrea. This group included Muhammad's daughter Ruqayyah and his son-in-law Uthman ibn Affan, who would later become the third caliph of the Rashidun Caliphate after Muhammad's death. Prior to the exile, Muhammad chose Uthman ibn Mazʽun, one of his most important companions, as the leader of this group. According to Tabqat Ibn Saʽd, the group boarded a merchant ship from the sea port of Shuʽaiba and paid a half-dinar each to cross into East Africa via the Red Sea. After a year, the exiles heard rumours that the Quraysh had converted to Islam, which prompted them to return to Mecca.

Some Western historians such as Leone Caetani (1869–1935) and William Montgomery Watt (1909–2006) questioned the account of two migrations. Although Ibn Ishaq provided two partially overlapping lists of migrants, he did not mention that the first group returned and went back a second time. Watt argued that the word used by Ibn Ishaq (tatāba‘a) and the order of the names on the lists suggests that the migration may have taken place in a number of smaller groups rather than two large parties, while the appearance of the two lists reflected the controversies surrounding the assignment of priority on official registers during the reign of the second Rashidun caliph, Umar ibn al-Khattab.

In Aksum
Much of the coverage of this event comes from the historian Ibn Ishaq.

When the Quraysh learned that the early Muslims were planning to move to the Aksumite kingdom, they sent a delegation to the Negus to demand the surrender of the fugitives. They selected two envoys: ‘Amr ibn al-‘As and Abdullah bin Rabiah. The Meccan envoys were given gifts for the Aksumite king Najashi and his generals. The gifts were made up of leather and prepared by fine skin. The Meccans appealed to the generals, arguing that the Muslim migrants were rebels who had invented a new religion, the likes of which neither the Meccans nor the Aksumites had heard of, and that their relatives were asking for their return. The king granted them an audience, but ultimately refused to hand over the migrants until he heard their defence.

The Sahabah were later brought in front of the Negus and his bishops. Jaʽfar ibn Abi Talib, who acted as the leader of the exiles, spoke in their defence:

The Christian king requested their revelations from God. Jaʽfar then recited a passage from the Quran's Surah Maryam. When the king heard it, he wept and exclaimed: "Verily, this and what Jesus brought (the Gospel) has come from the same source of light (miškāt)".

However, one of the envoys, ‘Amr ibn al-‘As, thought of an alternative tactic. On the following day, he returned to the king and told him that the Muslims had disrespected Jesus. When the Muslims heard that the king had summoned them again to question them about their view of Jesus, they tried to find a diplomatic answer, but ultimately decided to speak according to the revelation they had received. When the king addressed Jaʽfar, he replied that they held Jesus to be "God's servant, His prophet, His spirit, and His word which He cast upon the virgin Mary". Muslim accounts state that upon hearing these words, the Negus declared that Jesus was indeed no more than what he had said; he turned to the Muslims and told them: "go, for you are safe in my country". He then returned the gifts to the envoys and dismissed them.

End of the Muslim exile
Many of the exiles in Aksum returned to Mecca in 622 and made the hijra to Medina with Muhammad, while a second wave went to Medina in 628.

First migration list
The first list of emigrants reported by Ibn Ishaq included the following eleven men and four women:

Sa'd ibn Abi Waqqas
Jahsh ibn Riyab
Abd-Allah ibn Jahsh
Ja'far ibn Abi Talib leader of the group
Uthman, son-in-law and companion of Muhammad. Husband of Ruqayyah.
Ruqayyah bint Muhammad, the wife of Uthman and daughter of Muhammad.
Abu Hudhayfa ibn 'Utba
Sahla bint Suhail, wife of Abu Hudhayfa
Zubayr ibn al-Awwam
Mus'ab ibn Umair
Abdur Rahman bin Awf
Abu Salama Abd Allah ibn Abd al-Asad
Umm Salama, wife of Abu Salama
Uthman bin Maz'oon
Amir bin Rabiah
Layla bint Abi Asmah – wife of Amir

See also
Diplomatic career of Muhammad
Mosque of the Companions, Massawa
Negash
Second migration to Abyssinia
Timeline of 7th-century Muslim history

References

Islam in Ethiopia
Life of Muhammad
Medieval Ethiopia
Medieval Somalia
Horn of Africa
Islam in Eritrea
Islam in Somalia
610s
7th century in Africa
Christian and Islamic interfaith dialogue